This is a list of school districts in West Virginia, sorted in an alphabetical order.

Since 1933, all public school districts in the U.S. state of West Virginia have, by law, exactly followed the county boundaries.

B
Barbour County Schools
Berkeley County Schools
Boone County Schools
Braxton County Schools
Brooke County Schools

C
Cabell County Schools
Calhoun County Schools
Clay County Schools

D
Doddridge County Schools

F
Fayette County Schools

G
Gilmer County Schools
Grant County Schools
Greenbrier County Schools

H
Hampshire County Schools
Hancock County Schools
Hardy County Schools
Harrison County Schools

J
Jackson County Schools
Jefferson County Schools

K
Kanawha County Schools

L
Lewis County Schools
Lincoln County Schools
Logan County Schools

M
Marion County Schools
Marshall County Schools
Mason County Schools
McDowell County Schools
Mercer County Schools
Mineral County Schools
Mingo County Schools
Monongalia County Schools
Monroe County Schools
Morgan County Schools

N
Nicholas County Schools

O
Ohio County Schools

P
Pendleton County Schools
Pleasants County Schools
Pocahontas County Schools
Preston County Schools
Putnam County Schools

R
Raleigh County Schools
Randolph County Schools
Ritchie County Schools
Roane County Schools

S
Summers County Schools

T
Taylor County Schools
Tucker County Schools
Tyler County Schools

U
Upshur County Schools

W
Wayne County Schools
Webster County Schools
Wetzel County Schools
Wirt County Schools
Wood County Schools
Wyoming County Schools

See also
List of high schools in West Virginia

 
School districts in West Virginia, List of
West Virginia
School districts in West Virginia, List of